A cruise missile submarine is a submarine that carries and launches cruise missiles (SLCMs and anti-ship missiles) as its primary armament. Missiles greatly enhance a vessel's ability to attack surface combatants and strike land targets, and although torpedoes are a more stealthy option, missiles give a much longer stand-off range, as well as the ability to engage multiple targets on different headings at the same time. Many cruise missile submarines retain the capability to deploy nuclear warheads on their missiles, but they are considered distinct from ballistic missile submarines due to the substantial differences between the two weapons systems' characteristics.

Originally early designs of cruise missile submarines had to surface to launch their missiles, while later designs could do so underwater via dedicated vertical launching system (VLS) tubes. Many modern attack submarines can launch cruise missiles (and dedicated anti-ship missiles) from their torpedo tubes while some designs also incorporate a small number of VLS canisters, giving some significant overlap between cruise missile submarines and traditional attack submarines. Nonetheless, vessels classified as attack submarines still use torpedoes as their main armament and have a more multi-role mission profile due to their greater speed and maneuverability, in contrast to cruise missile submarines which are typically larger slower boats focused on the long distance surface strike role.

The United States Navy's hull classification symbols for cruise missile submarines are SSG and SSGN – the SS denotes submarine, the G denotes guided missile, and the N denotes that the submarine is nuclear-powered.

U.S. Navy
The U.S. Navy's first cruise missile submarines were developed in the early 1950s to carry the SSM-N-8 Regulus missile. Tunny was used as a test-bed for developing techniques of use for the missile system, before a second boat,  was subsequently converted. From 1957, these two boats undertook the first nuclear deterrent patrols. 

Between September 1959 and July 1964, the five Regulus missile boats undertook deterrent patrols in the Pacific Ocean, in concert with the newly commissioned  ballistic missile submarines (SSBN) in the Atlantic, until sufficient SSBNs were in service to replace them.

The conversion was achieved by installing vertical launching systems (VLS) in a multiple all-up-round canister (MAC) configuration in 22 of the 24 missile tubes, replacing one Trident missile with seven smaller Tomahawk cruise missiles. The two remaining tubes were converted to lockout chambers for use by special forces personnel. This gave each converted submarine the capability to carry up to 154 Tomahawks. The large diameter tubes can also be modified to carry and launch other payloads, such as UAVs or UUVs although these capabilities have not yet been fully implemented. In addition to generating a significant increase in stand-off strike capabilities, this conversion also counts as an arms reduction towards the START II treaty, because it reduces the number of nuclear weapons that are forward-deployed. USS Florida (SSGN-728) launched cruise missiles against Libyan targets as part of Operation Odyssey Dawn in March 2011.

The future Block V Virginia-class submarines are slated to supplement and eventually replace the Ohio SSGNs when they are retired; the USS Ohio itself is more than 40 years old.

Soviet Navy/Russian Navy
The Soviet Navy (and its successor, the Russian Navy) has operated a wide variety of dedicated cruise missile submarines:

The Whiskey variants and Echo I cruise missile submarines deployed with a nuclear land attack version of the P-5 Pyatyorka (SS-N-3 Shaddock) from the late 1950s to 1964, concurrently with the US Regulus force, until the strategic land attack mission was transferred entirely to the SSBN force. Along with the Julietts and Echo IIs, these continued as SSGs or SSGNs with an antiship variant of the P-5 until circa 1990. The Echo Is were an exception; they could not accommodate the antiship targeting radar and served as SSNs after the land attack missiles were withdrawn.

Apart from true SSGNs, Soviet attack submarines (SS/SSN) could launch various types of torpedo tube-launched missiles starting with the RK-55 and continuing with the Kalibr family of missiles. Cruise-missile capable Soviet SSNs may have a different designation to incapable sister boats (Victor III (Project 671RTM) boats became Project 671RTMK as they gained this ability, K for Крылатая ракета; cruise missile). Due to standardization of torpedo tube diameters, which are 533 mm, modern Russian submarine classes (even the diesel Kilo and Lada) are capable of launching long-range strategic cruise missiles from their torpedo tubes, without needing specialized compartments for missile tubes.

See also
List of submarine classes in service
List of submarine operators
List of NATO reporting names for guided-missile submarines
Missile boat (surface ship)
Transporter erector launcher (land vehicle)

References

External links

 
US Stingray style sub motherships test missiles. The Register, 31 May 2007